Om Prakash Mishra is a Nepali jurist. He was the 26th Chief Justice of the Supreme Court of Nepal. He was appointed to the highest position in the apex court on 3 August 2018.

Education

Mishra completed his Masters of Comparative Law (MCL) from Delhi University in 1989. He also studied Political Science from Tribhuvan University, completing in 1985.

He speaks Bhojpuri (native), Nepali (spoken and written), English (spoken and written) and Hindi (spoken and written)

Career

Participation in different law related events

Judicial institution of Australia
3rd South Asia Chief Justices Roundtable on Environmental Justice Sri Lanka
Enforceable World Law - India 
Commercial Court of Australia
Court and Case Management System of Philippines

See also
 Cholendra Shumsher JBR
 Deepak Raj Joshee
 Gopal Prasad Parajuli

References

External links
Chief Justice of Nepal

Living people
Justices of the Supreme Court of Nepal
1954 births
Nepalese Hindus
People from Rupandehi District
Delhi University alumni
Chief justices of Nepal
Nepal Law Campus alumni